David Ross Hope Bridie is an Australian contemporary musician and songwriter. He was a founding mainstay member of World music band Not Drowning, Waving which released six studio albums to critical acclaim. He also formed a chamber pop group, My Friend the Chocolate Cake, which released seven studio albums. During his solo career he has issued five studio albums and worked on soundtracks for Australian films and television like The Man Who Sued God, Remote Area Nurse, Secret City, and The Circuit. Bridie is the founder and artistic director of Wantok Musik Foundation; a not-for-profit music label that records, releases and promotes culturally infused music from Indigenous Australia, Melanesia and Oceania. In 2019 he received the Don Banks Music Award.

Biography 

David Bridie was born in 1962 and grew up in the Melbourne suburb of Deepdene with three siblings. He received training in classical music. From 1980 to 1983 Bridie provided keyboards for Misspent Youth, with James Southall on percussion. They travelled to Perth, after their lead singer convinced them they would earn more money. Bridie had dropped out of his Arts/Law degree course for the venture, but found that Perth bands performed cover versions due to "the city's penchant for Top 40 and retro hits." They returned to Melbourne and he left the group soon after. He was also a member of Go Circus, alongside Rowan McKinnon on bass guitar.

Bridie on vocals, piano, synthesiser and percussion formed a World music duo, Not Drowning, Waving in Melbourne in 1983 with fellow classical musician John Phillips on guitar. The pair had met at La Trobe University when Bridie invited Phillips to help record a track, "Moving Around", which had McKinnon providing bass guitar. Initially Not Drowning, Waving was a studio-only project while Bridie, McKinnon, Phillips and Southall formed a performance group, Easter, with Russel Bradley on drums and Tim Cole on lead vocals. "Moving Around" was issued as Not Drowning, Waving's debut single in April 1984. The duo followed with their debut album, Another Pond, in January 1985 via Rampant Records. It was produced by their Easter bandmate, Cole.

Easter were performing shows around Melbourne and released their own single, "Cheesecloth", in August 1985. Some of its members joined Not Drowning, Waving and the two groups co-existed with almost the same line-up. Not Drowning, Waving started live shows, while Easter wound down and eventually disbanded. Bridie and Phillips also worked in screen music beginning with the soundtrack for a film documentary, Canoe Man, directed by Mark Worth. To research music for the documentary, Bridie had travelled to Rabaul, Papua New Guinea (PNG) in 1986 and first heard George Telek's "amazing song coming out of a recording studio." He returned, with Not Drowning, Waving, to Rabaul in late 1988 to record their fifth album, Tabaran (1990). Aside from Telek they used other local musicians, and the album was co-credited to The Musicians of Rabaul, Papua New Guinea featuring Telek. They toured PNG together, including a concert at the nation's capital, Port Moresby, to an audience of 25000; and then they toured Australia.

In late 1989 Helen Mountfort joined Not Drowning, Waving after having provided cello on a track on Tabaran. Bridie, with bandmates Bradley and Mountfort formed an acoustic strings-based side project, My Friend the Chocolate Cake, as a chamber pop group. Other founders were Andrew Caswell on mandolin, Hope Csutoros on violin and Andrew Richardson on guitar. They released a self-titled album in 1991 with Bridie co-producing alongside Mountfort, Carswell and Cole. Also in that year Not Drowning, Waving provided the soundtrack for comedy-drama film, Proof. Bridie and Mountfort worked with Jen Anderson on violin (ex-the Black Sorrows) and members of Hunters & Collectors' horn section on a feature film, Hammers Over the Anvil (1993), which was issued in the following year as a soundtrack album, Hammers, credited to Not Drowning, Waving. That group had released their sixth and last studio album, Circus, in 1993 and disbanded by the end of the year.

AllMusic's Australian-based music journalist, Ed Nimmervoll, observed that Bridie and Phillips' early work, "sparked the duo's enthusiasm for the sort of free-form ambient soundscapes that would become the basis of their sound as the group Not Drowning Waving and lay the seeds for their interest in film music." Fellow Australian music historian, Ian McFarlane, noticed the influences of Brian Eno and David Byrne on the pair, but "[they] were not averse to incorporating African and other Third World rhythms into their muse. Likewise, they placed an emphasis on natural acoustic and atmospheric dynamics rather than an electronic approach."

My Friend the Chocolate Cake, with Bridie and Mountfort as mainstays, issued seven studio albums before the group took an indefinite hiatus from August 2018. Periodically Not Drowning, Waving have reformed in 1996, 2001, 2003 and 2005 to 2006 and released a live album. Bridie and Phillips have issued two duo albums,  Projects 1983–1993 (1994) and Projects 2 (2011). After My Friend the Chocolate Cake's debut album Bridie's further work as a record producer in the mid-1990s includes Archie Roach's Jamu Dreaming (1993), Paul Kelly's Wanted Man (1994) and Christine Anu's Stylin' Up (1995). He joined Anu's touring band in support of her album's release throughout 1995. At the ARIA Music Awards of 1995 he was nominated for Producer of the Year.

During 1998 he recorded a soundtrack album, In a Savage Land (November 1999), for a feature film of the same name, which was set and partly filmed on PNG's Trobriand Islands. He had collaborated with Musicians from the Trobriand Islands. His score received widespread critical acclaim, Andrew L. Urban of Urban Cinefile praised the film's "unity of vision", in using "a wide palette of extraordinary music and sound." His work achieved multiple awards, Best Original Score at the 1999 AFI Awards, Best Music Score from the Film Critics Circle of Australia, and Best Original Soundtrack Album at the 2000 ARIA Awards. Upon reflection Bridie explained to Paris Pompor of FilmInk in 2017 why it was one of his favourite projects, "[it] allowed me to soak in the Trobriand Islands' culture and stay in a beach shack for eight weeks recording anything that moved and learning about a fascinating part of the world. It was dark, cultural and layered and challenging and I had free reign."

His first solo studio album, Act of Free Choice, appeared in May 2000, and "was greeted with critical praise." The album's title refers to the Indonesian Act of Free Choice (1969), which was supported by a plebiscite on the incorporation of Western New Guinea into Indonesia. Bridie's Act of Free Choice reached the top 40 on the ARIA Albums Chart. Evan Cater of AllMusic rated it at three-out-of-five stars and explained, "[he] finds new layers in his well-established gift for moody atmospherics" although "his breathy tenor can be slightly grating", while "his real strength lies in a compositional adventurousness." PopMatters Imran Khan determined, "[he] created a new world of sound to explore, one that would define him as an artist as well as create a sonic visual that would allow the listener to enter that world and immerse himself in the emotional experience created from the album’s imagined realities." In 2019 he received the Don Banks Music Award.

Discography

Studio albums

Compilation albums

Soundtracks

Over the years, David Bridie has balanced his career as a live musician with the composition of soundtrack music, with credits for over 100 feature films including Proof, Bran Nue Dae, The Man Who Sued God and Gone, several of which received International release. He also received the ARIA Award for "Best Original Soundtrack, Cast or Show Album" for Nautical Forlorn in 2004.

David Bridie has also contributed to many television shows, short films and documentaries soundtracks most notably for  Remote Area Nurse for which he won an AFI Award as well as The Straits, Dealine Gallipoli and Secret City.

The song "Pitjantjara" written and performed with Frank Yamma for The Alice was awarded an APRA Screen Music Award for "Best Original Song" composed for a 'Feature Film, Telemovie, TV Series or Mini-Series'.

Awards and nominations

!
|-
| 1995 || himself || ARIA Award for Producer of the Year ||  || 
|-
| 1996 || That Eye, the Sky (with John Phillips) || APRA Screen Music Award for Best Film Score ||  || 
|-
| 1996 || "Fool for You" by Monique Brumby || ARIA Award for Producer of the Year ||  || 
|-
| 1997 || "Mary" by Monique Brumby || ARIA Award for Producer of the Year ||  || 
|-
| 1999 || In a Savage Land || AFI Award for Best Original Score ||  || 
|-
| 1999 || In a Savage Land || Film Critics Circle of Australia Award for Best Music Score ||  || 
|-
|rowspan="4"| 2000 || In a Savage Land || ARIA Award for Best Original Soundtrack Album ||  ||rowspan="4"| 
|-
|rowspan="3"| Act of Free Choice || ARIA Award for Album of the Year || 
|-
| ARIA Award for Best Male Artist || 
|-
| ARIA Award for Best Alternative Release || 
|-
|rowspan="2"| 2003 || Hotel Radio || ARIA Award for Best Adult Contemporary Album ||  ||rowspan="2"| 
|-
| West Papua: Sound of the Morning Star || ARIA Award for Best World Music Album || 
|-
| 2004 ||Nautical Forlorn || ARIA Award for Best Original Soundtrack, Cast or Show Album ||  || 
|-
| 2004 || Land of the Morning Star || AACTA Awards for Best Sound in a Non-Feature Film ||  ||
|-
|rowspan="2"| 2005 || The Alice: "Pitjantjara" (with Frank Yamma) || APRA Screen Music Award for Best Original Song composed for a Feature Film, Telemovie, TV Series or Mini-Series ||  ||rowspan="2"| 
|-
| The Alice || APRA Screen Music Award for Best Music for a Mini-Series or Telemovie || 
|-
| 2006 || Remote Area Nurse (with Albert David, Kadu, Key Torres Strait Island Composers) || APRA Screen Music Award for Best Soundtrack Album ||  || 
|-
| 2006 || Remote Area Nurse || ARIA Award for Best Original Soundtrack, Cast or Show Album ||  || 
|-
|rowspan="2"| 2007 || The Circuit || ARIA Award for Best Original Soundtrack, Cast or Show Album ||  ||rowspan="2"| 
|-
| Gone || ARIA Award for Best Original Soundtrack, Cast or Show Album || 
|-
| 2009 || Two Fists, One Heart || APRA Screen Music Award for Best Feature Film Score ||  || 
|-
| 2011 || Strange Birds in Paradise: A West Papuan Soundtrack || ARIA Award for Best World Music Album ||  || 
|-
| 2012 || The Straits || APRA Screen Music Award for Best Soundtrack Album ||  || 
|-
| 2013 || Satellite Boy || ARIA Award for Best Original Soundtrack, Cast or Show Album ||  || 
|-
| 2013 ||  David Bridie || Music Victoria Awards Best Male ||  || 
|-
|rowspan="2"| 2016 || Putuparri and the Rainmakers || APRA Screen Music Award for Best Music for a Documentary ||  || 
|-
| Secret City || APRA Screen Music Award for Best Music for a Mini-Series or Telemovie ||  || 
|-
| 2017 || Music project: a Bit na Ta || APRA Art Music Award for Excellence by an Individual ||  || 
|-
| 2017 || A Bit na Ta (with George Telek & Musicians of the Gunantuna) || Music Victoria Awards Best Global or Reggae Album ||  || 
|-
|rowspan="3"| 2019 || Australia's Lost Impressionist || APRA Screen Music Award for Best Music for a Documentary ||  || 
|-
| Secret City: Under the Eagle: "Run Little Rabbit" || APRA Screen Music Award for Best Music for a Television Series or Serial ||  || 
|-
| The Merger || APRA Screen Music Award for Best Soundtrack Album ||  || 
|-
| 2019 || himself || Don Banks Music Award ||  || 
|-
| 2020 || The Skin of Others: "Ballad of the Bridge-Builders" (with Tom Murray) || APRA Screen Music Award for Best Original Song Composed for the Screen ||  || 
|-
|}

References

General
  Note: Archived [on-line] copy has limited functionality.
Specific

External links
 
 Follow the Geography, a website devoted to all of David Bridie's projects
 My Friend the Chocolate Cake
 
 2007 interview with David Bridie

1960s births
APRA Award winners
ARIA Award winners
Australian songwriters
Living people
Musicians from Melbourne